The blunt-nosed snowtrout (Schizothorax molesworthi) is a species of ray-finned fish in the genus Schizothorax from the Brahmaputra River drainage in India and China, where it is heavily exploited for food.

References 

Schizothorax
Fish described in 1913
Taxa named by Banawari Lal Chaudhuri